The $1.98 Beauty Show is an American game show that aired in syndication from September 1978 to September 1980.

Hosted by Rip Taylor, the series is a parody of beauty contests, and featured six female contestants (including the occasional overweight ones, as well as celebrities  Sandra Bernhard, Rhonda Shear, and actress Teresa Ganzel, and on at least one occasion a male dressed in drag) competing for the title of "$1.98 Beauty Queen".

Chuck Barris created the series and was executive producer. Johnny Jacobs was the announcer.

Format
The show consists of three rounds, during which each contestant is judged by three celebrity panelists. These include Jaye P. Morgan, Jamie Farr, Steve Garvey, Rosey Grier, Patty Andrews, Louis Nye, Peter Lawford, Dorothy Lamour, Marty Allen, Trini Lopez and the Unknown Comic (all of whom served as panelists on The Gong Show). Emcee Taylor introduces the contestants one at a time.

Round 2 features each contestant showcasing their "abilities". Round 3 is a swimsuit competition, in which emcee Taylor ushers the contenders on stage and announcer Jacobs cracks jokes about their vital statistics and hobbies.

At the end of each show, Taylor announces the "$1.98 Beauty of The Week." That contestant is presented with a tacky plastic crown, rotten vegetables as a bouquet, and the titular cash prize of $1.98, which Taylor dispenses from a coin holder on his belt.

The outcome was previously arranged, as was noted in the introductory monologue by the announcer and the fine print of the closing credits of each episode.

Music

Music cues used on this show include "Happy Days Are Here Again" (Taylor's theme song), "Oh You Beautiful Doll", and "Ain't She Sweet". In addition, Taylor serenades the winning contestant as a parody of Bert Parks having done the same on the Miss America Pageant.

The show's bandleader, Milton DeLugg, used all the same musicians from the band heard on The Gong Show, plus two additional saxophone players for the first season only.

References

External links 
 

1978 American television series debuts
1980 American television series endings
1970s American comedy game shows
1980s American comedy game shows
English-language television shows
Fashion-themed television series
First-run syndicated television programs in the United States
Beauty pageant parodies
Television series by Barris Industries
Television series by Sony Pictures Television
Television series created by Chuck Barris
Television series about beauty pageants